Lake Harris is a small alpine lake near the Harris Saddle on the Routeburn Track in the South Island of New Zealand.

Biodiversity
Lake Harris is the type locality for the data deficient moth Hydriomena iolanthe. This moth is known only from a single specimen which is now lost.

References

Lakes of Otago